Unspoken is Christian artist Jaci Velasquez's fourth studio album. It was released on March 25, 2003, debuting at No. 55 in the Billboard 200. Seven weeks later, it was off the charts. Nevertheless, it did extremely well in the Top Gospel Albums chart. It was the first English album by Jaci that did not have a whole or partial Spanish song.

Track listing
 "You're My God" - 3:26 (Jaci Velasquez, Bridget Benenate, Matthew Gerrard)
 "Jesus Is" - 3:47 (Jaci Velasquez, Bridget Benenate, Matthew Gerrard)
 "Lost Without You" - 4:11 (Bridget Benenate)
 "Where I Belong" - 4:18 (Jaci Velasquez, Bridget Benenate, Matthew Gerrard)
 "The Real Me" - 3:40 (Jaci Velasquez, Bridget Benenate)
 "He" - 3:34 (Hunter Davis, Chris Faulk) 
 "Glass House" - 3:41 (Jaci Velasquez, Bridget Benenate, Tom McWilliams)
 "Your Friend" - 3:45 (Jaci Velasquez, Abel Orta, Javier Solís)
 "Something" - 3:20 (Hunter Davis, Chris Faulk) 
 "Unspoken" - 3:26 (Madeline Stone, Orrin Hatch, Toby Gad)
 "I'm Alive" - 4:15 (Jaci Velasquez, Cindy Morgan)
 "Shine" - 4:09 (Dillon O'Brien, Dillon O'Doherty)

Personnel
 Bridget Benenate – backing vocals
 Jammes "Jamba" Castro – keyboards
 Javier Carrion – bass
 John Catchings – cello
 David Davidson – violin
 Danny Duncan – engineer
 Tom McWilliams – producer, acoustic guitar, arrangements
 Abel Orta – backing vocals, bass guitar
 Pete Orta – electric guitar 
 Rachel Perry – backing vocals
 Freddy Piñero, Jr. – engineer, guitar, arrangements, producer, programming
 Michael Ripoll – acoustic guitar, Spanish guitar, sitar
 Scott Savage – drums
 Marvin Sims – drums
 Tommy Sims – synthesizer bass, synthesizer, rhythm box, producer, acoustic piano, Moog bass, Minimoog, loops, keyboards, bass guitar, acoustic guitar, arrangements
 Javier Solís – percussion
 Emilio Estefan, Jr. –  producer
 Bryan Lenox – engineer
 Drew Douthit – digital editing
 David J. Holman – mixing
 Tom Coyne – mastering
 Jamie Kiner – production coordination
 Alban Christ – photography
 Ray Roper – design, art direction
 Linda Bourne Wornell – artist coordination
 Jaci Velasquez – lead vocals, backing vocals, A&R
 Barry Landis – A&R
 Dionicio R. Lopez – A&R
 Dana Reed
 Angela Primm
 Akil Thompson
 Roz Clark Thompson
 Melinda Doolittle
 Jovaun Woods
 Billy Gaines

Charts

References

Jaci Velasquez albums
2003 albums